Gallery is a Canadian documentary television series which aired on CBC Television from 1973 to 1979.

Premise
This series featured various documentaries, taking an approach which was less serious than usual.

Scheduling
This half-hour series was first broadcast on Saturdays at 10:00 p.m. (Eastern) from 19 May to 11 August 1973. It was rebroadcast on Wednesdays at 10:00 p.m. from 10 October to 7 November 1973. The second and final season of original episodes was from 3 January to 4 April 1975 on Fridays at 10:30 p.m. Further rebroadcasts were shown on CBC as mid-year programming in 1977 and 1979.

Episodes
Documentaries featured during the series run included the following:

 Bluegrass Country (Bob Fresco, Max Engel), featuring a music festival in The Ozarks
 The Bricklin Story (Pen Densham, John Watson, Insight Productions), featuring Malcolm Bricklin and his SV-1 automobile
 The Master Blasters, featuring a family-run demolition company
 To Be A Clown (Paul Saltzman), featuring an Ottawa-based clown school
 Whatever Became of Hollywood? (Eric Riisna director), an adaptation of Richard Lamparski's biographies on historic entertainers
 Winning Is The Only Thing (Donald Shebib director), concerning a minor league hockey team in Manitoba

References

External links
 

CBC Television original programming
1973 Canadian television series debuts
1975 Canadian television series endings